Eri Hatayama (born 5 May 1992) is a Japanese sailor. She competed in the Nacra 17 event at the 2020 Summer Olympics.

References

External links
 
 

1992 births
Living people
Japanese female sailors (sport)
Olympic sailors of Japan
Sailors at the 2020 Summer Olympics – Nacra 17
Place of birth missing (living people)